Parker's green tree skink (Prasinohaema parkeri)  is a species of skink found in New Guinea.

References

Prasinohaema
Reptiles described in 1937
Taxa named by Malcolm Arthur Smith